is an indoor sports arena located in Naka-ku, Yokohama, Japan. The capacity of the arena is 5,000 people and was opened in 1962.

It is a five-minute walk from the closest subway station, Kannai Station, on the JR/Yokohama Municipal Subway.

The arena hosted the volleyball events of the 1964 Summer Olympics.

The last major event held at the arena was an event held by Big Japan Pro Wrestling on August 30, 2020 which was called "Last Buntai". The arena closed its doors on September 6, 2020 with Yokohama United Arena set to replace this gymnasium in 2024.

Facilities
Main arena - 1,920m2, 40m×48m×13m

References
 
 1964 Summer Olympics official report. Volume 1. Part 1. p. 139.

Defunct indoor arenas in Japan
Basketball venues in Japan
Boxing venues in Japan
Music venues in Japan
Olympic volleyball venues
Sports venues in Yokohama
Venues of the 1964 Summer Olympics
Yokohama B-Corsairs
Sports venues completed in 1962
1962 establishments in Japan
Naka-ku, Yokohama
2020 disestablishments in Japan